Il sesso degli angeli is a 2022 Italian comedy film directed by Leonardo Pieraccioni.

Cast

References

External links

2022 films
Films directed by Leonardo Pieraccioni
2020s Italian-language films
2022 comedy films
Italian comedy films
2020s Italian films